Srija Seshadri (born 15 August 1997) is an Indian female chess player. FIDE awarded her the title of Woman Grandmaster (WGM) in July 2019.

Chess career
Seshadri became a Woman International Master (WIM) in 2017. She attained her first Woman Grandmaster (WGM) norm at the 2nd Mumbai International Chess Tournament in Mumbai in December 2016. Next at the Masters International Chess Championship in Sharjah in March 2017, she earned her second WGM norm. Seshadri achieved her third and final WGM norm in June 2019 at the Mayor's Cup International Open Chess Tournament in Mumbai.

Seshadri finished third at the Woman Grandmaster chess championship at the Acres Club in Mumbai in June 2018. She picked an International Master (IM) norm at Mayor Club chess tournament in Mumbai in June 2019. She finished sixth at the 46th National Women Chess Championship held at Karaikudi, Tamil Nadu in July 2019, scoring a total of eight points in the eleven rounds.

See also
 List of Indian chess players § Woman Grandmasters
 Chess in India

References

External links
 
 
 

1997 births
Living people
Indian female chess players
Chess woman grandmasters
Sportswomen from Tamil Nadu
Sportspeople from Chennai